Katherine Morgan  is the name of:

Kathryn Morgan, ballet dancer
Kathy Morgan, a character in Spellbinder: Land of the Dragon Lord

See also
Katie Morgan (born 1980), American actress
Kate Morgan (1865–1892), alleged ghost